Restaurant Apicius is a restaurant located in Bakkum, Castricum in the Netherlands. It is a fine dining restaurant that is awarded one or two Michelin stars from 2002 up until now. GaultMillau awarded them 16.0 points (out of 20).

The restaurant is run by two brothers: head chef Thorvald de Winter and Maître Gaylord de Winter.

According to Diningcity.com Restaurant Apicius has won Penfolds Culinary Trophy.

Star history
- 2002-2006: one star
- 2007-2010: two stars
- 2011-2020: one star

See also
List of Michelin starred restaurants in the Netherlands

Sources and references 

Restaurants in the Netherlands
Michelin Guide starred restaurants in the Netherlands